Bhukaredi is a village in Ratangarh tehsil of Churu district in Rajasthan. This village was founded by Bhukar gotra Jats.

References 

Villages in Churu district